The Hilton Anatole is a Dallas hotel at 2201 Stemmons Freeway in the Market Center district just north of downtown Dallas, Texas. Featuring 1,606 guest rooms, it is one of the largest hotels in the South and is a major convention and meeting facility. Over 1,000 art objects, including a casting of Riding Into the Sunset and two sections of the Berlin Wall, are located throughout the resort setting. The hotel previously featured the five-star Nana Restaurant, but it closed in May 2012 due to decreased demand for fine dining restaurants and was replaced with a high-energy steak house, SĒR (pronounced sear).

History
The Anatole Hotel was developed in the late 1970s by Trammell Crow as part of his huge Dallas Market Center complex. The hotel, named after a restaurant Crow favored in Copenhagen, opened in 1979 as the Loews Anatole Hotel, with 1,000 rooms in two pyramid-topped buildings. In 1981, a 27-story tower containing 700 rooms, a ballroom, meeting space, shops, a health club, and a seven-acre garden was added to the hotel.  Also in 1984, the hotel served as the headquarters for the Reagan-Bush '84 campaign staff during the Republican National Convention in Dallas.  In 1995 Wyndham Hotels, a company owned by the Crow family, took over management of the hotel, renaming it the Wyndham Anatole Hotel and expanding the meeting facilities. It was the largest hotel in the South until the opening of the Sheraton Dallas Hotel in 1998.

In 2005, management of the Anatole transferred from Wyndham International to Hilton Hotels Corp., now Hilton Resorts, and the hotel was re-branded as the Hilton Anatole.  Since becoming a Hilton, Crow Holdings and Hilton have invested over $185 million in enhancements to the hotel, including refurbished guest rooms & suites, upgraded meeting space, new restaurants & bars, and a new center Atrium (Grand Atrium). The Anatole is rated Four Diamonds by AAA Travel.

As of 2011, the Anatole has been host five times to QuakeCon, the largest LAN party in North America. The Anatole also hosts the annual Crystal Charity Ball, one of the largest single night charitable events in the United States. The Anatole is also the site for A-Kon, the longest running anime convention in the US.

In 2014, Hilton announced the opening of Geppetto's Marionette Theater as a collaborative venture with Le Theatre de Marionette.

JadeWaters, a $20 million seasonal resort pool complex, opened in late July 2016 utilizing 3 acres of the Anatole's seven acre park area. JadeWaters features a lazy river, two 180 foot water slides, a children's area, 46 pieces of art, a full-service restaurant and a large year-round leisure pool. It is an exclusive amenity for hotel guests

The Hilton Anatole was featured in several episodes of Season 13 of The Bachelorette.

The Hilton Anatole hosted auditions for the first season of American Idol in 2002.

In 2021, the hotel was host to the Conservative Political Action Conference, and featured prominent conservative speakers, including US senators and congressional representatives, Republican governors and media personalities.  The keynote speech was given by former President Donald Trump. 

On October 11, 1990 the Chantilly Ballroom of the Anatole hosted a luncheon of the Greater Dallas Crime Commission that would turn out to have a major impact on the course of Texas politics.  Republican Gubernatorial nominee Clayton Williams, incensed by hard-hitting television ads by State Treasurer and Democratic Gubernatorial nominee Ann Richards, confronted Richards at her seat at the head table shortly before the luncheon speaking began, in full view of television cameras, telling a companion "watch this" and then going up to Richards saying "I'm here to. . . to call you a liar today", with a stunned Richards then standing up and patting Williams on his left arm and saying "Aww, I'm sorry", with Williams then saying "Well no, that's what you are, you lied about me, you lied about (former Governor) Mark White (Texas politician), you lied about (State Attorney General) Jim Mattox, (inaudible), I'm going to finish this deal and you can count on it."  Richards then said "Well, I'll tell you what Clayton", and extended her hand out toward him but Williams gave her a contemptuous wave of his right hand and said "I don't want to shake your hand" and greeted someone else at the table on the way to his seat there.  Williams, already losing ground in the race after having a lead in polls over fifteen points, lost even more after a gaffe widely shown both in Texas and nationally and perceived by many as discourteous and unchivalrous by a candidate who regularly cultivated a cowboy image.  Williams would commit more public relations blunders before the election and lost to Richards 49.5 to 46.9% despite the earlier wide polling lead and also despite outspending Richards - bloodied by a nasty Democratic primary and runoff while Williams easily coasted to a 60% plus Republican primary win - about $21 to 12 million.  To date, Williams is the last Republican nominee to lose a Texas Gubernatorial election.

References

External links

Hilton Anatole official site

Skyscraper hotels in Dallas
Hotel buildings completed in 1979
Hotel buildings completed in 1981
Hotels established in 1979
Anatole
1979 establishments in Texas